Tetracyclics are cyclic chemical compounds that contain four fused rings of atoms, for example, Tröger's base.

Some tricyclic compounds having three fused and one tethered ring (connected to main nucleus by a single bond) can also classified as tetracyclic, for example, ciclazindol.

Tetracyclic compounds have various pharmaceutical uses, such as:
tetracycline antibiotics
Doxycycline
Tigecycline
Omadacycline
Eravacycline
tetracyclic antidepressants
Benzoctamine
Loxapine
Mazindol
Mianserin
Mirtazapine

See also
 Tricyclic
 Heterocyclic

References